The Western Conference on Linguistics, usually known as WECOL, is an annual conference held in rotating locations in the western part of the United States and Canada since 1988. Papers for presentation are chosen by a selection committee with the assistance of reports by referees. There is no restriction by topic though there is a slant toward linguistic theory.

Papers presented at the conference are published by the Department of Linguistics at California State University, Fresno. The proceedings have been available on-line since 2004.

External links
Conference Website
Conference Proceedings

Linguistics conferences